A Chorus of Disapproval may refer to:
A Chorus of Disapproval (play), a 1984 play by Alan Ayckbourn
A Chorus of Disapproval (film), a 1988 film adaptation of the play of the same title